Jensen Oval is a suburban soccer park located on 30 Clapham Road, Sefton, Sydney, Australia, within the City of Canterbury-Bankstown. It is the homeground of the Bankstown City Lions who last played in the New South Wales Premier League in 2011 and Bankstown United FC who last played at Jensen Park in 2022. It can currently hold up to 8,000 spectators. It has 2 main grandstands & a training park next to it.
 
It was built early in the 1960s as a Premier Ground for football in the Bankstown LGA. The Oval's facilities include play equipment, a soccer field, turf cricket pitch and toilets. Before the rebuild in the early 1960s it had been used by the local junior Regents Parks Soccer Club and also for cricket since at least the early 1950s.

In 2018 City of Canterbury-Bankstown Council has accepted $2.5 million upgrade to install an artificial turf surface at its Jensen Park soccer field. Construction is scheduled to begin in June and be completed by the end of February, 2019. The Council will work with Bankstown City Lions on future maintenance on the field.

References

City of Canterbury-Bankstown
Soccer venues in Sydney
Sports venues in Sydney